Boston University School of Law (Boston Law or BU Law) is the law school of Boston University, a private research university in Boston, Massachusetts. Established in 1872, Boston University Law is the second-oldest law school in the state of Massachusetts, after Harvard University, and is the third-oldest law school in New England, after Harvard and Yale University. The school is an original charter member of the American Bar Association, and is one of the oldest continuously operating law schools in the country. Approximately 630 students are enrolled in the full-time J.D. degree program (approximately 210 per class) and about 350 in the school's five LLM degree programs. Boston University Law was one of the first law schools in the country to admit students to study law regardless of race or gender.

History

The Boston University School of Law was founded in 1872. It was one of the first law schools to admit women and minorities, at a time when most other law schools barred them. In 1881, Lelia J. Robinson became the first female BU Law graduate. Then, women lawyers were less than half of one percent of the profession.  Upon graduation, she successfully lobbied the Massachusetts legislature to permit the admission of women to the state bar, and in 1882, became the first woman admitted to the Massachusetts bar. Her classmate, Nathan Abbott, would later become the founding dean of Stanford Law School. Another prominent female alumna at the time, Alice Stone Blackwell, would go on to help found the League of Women Voters and edit the Woman's Journal. Takeo Kikuchi (1877), the school's first Japanese graduate, was co-founder and president of Tokyo's English Law School which grew into Chuo University. Clara Burrill Bruce (1926) was the first black woman elected editor-in-chief of a law review (the Boston University Law Review).

BU Law's first buildings were 36 Bromfield Street, 18–20 Beacon Street and 10 Ashburton Place. The first year of courses commenced in 1872.
In 1895, the university's trustees acquired 11 Ashburton Place, which was refurbished and named Isaac Rich Hall in honor of the third founder of Boston University. The dedication speaker was Oliver Wendell Holmes, Jr. whose historic speech The Path of the Law was delivered in 1897.

In 1918, former United States President William Howard Taft lectured on legal ethics at BU Law until his appointment as chief justice of the Supreme Court two years later. In 1921, the Boston University Law Review was founded.

Isaac Rich Hall housed BU Law until 1964. In 1964 BU Law occupied the bottom half of the current building, 765 Commonwealth Avenue on the Charles River Campus, colloquially known as the "Tower". BU Law shared the Tower with the School of Education for some years but now occupies the entire building.  The School of Law's legal library, the Fineman & Pappas Law Libraries, occupies three floors in the Law Complex, spanning both the Law Tower and the Redstone Building. The Libraries also include two floors of closed stacks in the basement of the adjacent Mugar Memorial Library, BU's main library. The entire BU Law tower underwent a multi-million dollar refurbishment from 2014 to 2018.

In 1975, BU Law began publishing the American Journal of Law & Medicine.

US Supreme Court Justice Stephen Breyer delivered a notable BU Law lecture outlining an optimistic view of the judiciary and its power to use the United States Constitution to for good.

In July 2016, the United States Department of Health and Human Services announced a new partnership allowing BU Law to serve as headquarters for a $350 million initiative researching and combating antibiotic-resistant diseases, CARB-X. Professor Kevin Outterson, a health law specialist and researcher at BU Law, serves as executive director of the initiative, which is named CARB-X.

Academics
Boston University School of Law offers a rigorous and broad selection of legal classes and seminars with a student to faculty ratio of 12:1. It offers the J.D. and Master of Laws (LL.M.) degrees as well as numerous dual degrees. With over 200 courses and seminars, BU Law's curriculum is one of the widest selections of any law school in the country. This curriculum covers in 18 different areas of legal study. The student to faculty is 6:1. 

There are approximately 20 study abroad opportunities at BU Law, which most students partake in their second year, including dual-degree programs with international universities. The campus offers five moot court opportunities, seven academic concentration tracks, and legal writing on six academic journals.

Admissions
BU Law's most recent entering class comes from 41 states and the District of Columbia. These students represent 16 countries and 155 undergraduate institutions.

Admission to Boston University School of Law is especially competitive, with a 12% acceptance rate in the 2021-2022 admissions cycle. The 50th LSAT percentile for the 2022 entering class was 170, and the median GPA was a 3.84. The BU Law Admissions office hosts a large alumni network. There are 25,000+ BU Law alumni worldwide.

Rankings
Boston University School of Law was ranked 17th among American law schools in the 2023 list of best law schools compiled by U.S. News & World Report. It has ranked as high as 11th and as low as 22 in the same ranking. U.S. News also ranked the school's Health Law program #5 and Intellectual Property Law program #11. BU Law was ranked # 8 for graduates with the best debt-to-salary ratio. In 2022, it was ranked #29 by the Above The Law Top 50 Law Schools list for post-graduate gainful employment.

Attorney Skills Accelerator Program
The Attorney Skills Accelerator Program (ASAP) at Boston University School of Law offers summer classes, clinics, and externships for qualified J.D. students enrolled in accredited law schools. During Summer 2017, ASAP students will be able to enroll in Contract Drafting and/or Negotiation courses. ASAP students will also have the opportunity to take part in a legal externship, or one of three clinics:
 Entrepreneurship & IP Clinic
 Legislative Policy & Drafting Clinic
 Criminal Law: Prosecutor Clinic

Law journals
 Boston University Law Review
 American Journal of Law & Medicine
 Review of Banking & Financial Law
 Boston University International Law Journal
 Journal of Science & Technology Law
 Public Interest Law Journal

Costs
The total cost of attendance (indicating the cost of tuition, fees, and living expenses) at BU Law for the 2017–18 academic year was $74,689. The Law School Transparency estimated debt-financed cost of attendance for three years is $243,230.

Employment 
According to BU Law's official 2019 ABA-required disclosures, 87.6% of the Class of 2017 obtained full-time, long-term, JD-required employment ten months after graduation. BU Law's Law School Transparency under-employment score is 11.3%, indicating the percentage of the Class of 2019 unemployed, pursuing an additional degree, or working in a non-professional, short-term, or part-time job ten months after graduation.

For new graduates, the self-reported median starting salary for the class of 2019 was $176,000 in the private sector, and $79,000 in the public sector.  This ranked the school #9 on the US News list "Schools Where Salaries for Grads Most Outweigh the Debt". BU placed 68 graduates from the class of 2019 at NLJ 100 firms, earning it the number 15 slot on the National Journal law school rankings for large law firm employment.

Notable people

Alumni

 Frederic W. Allen, LLB 1951, chief justice of the Vermont Supreme Court (1984-1997)
 Lincoln C. Almond, JD 1961, governor of Rhode Island
 George W. Anderson, LLB 1890, judge of the U.S. Court of Appeals for the First Circuit.
 Consuelo Northrup Bailey, LLB 1925, first woman elected as lieutenant governor in the United States
 F. Lee Bailey, LLB 1960, criminal defense lawyer; represented Sam Sheppard and O. J. Simpson, among others
 Albert Brown, LLB 1904, governor of New Hampshire
 Fred H. Brown, LLB 1884, governor of New Hampshire, U.S. congressman
 Edward W. Brooke, LLB 1948, LLM 1949, attorney general of Massachusetts; first African American elected to the Senate by popular vote; one of only five African Americans to serve in the U.S. Senate; awarded the Presidential Medal of Freedom.
 William M. Butler, LLB 1884, U.S. senator (MA)
 Norman S. Case, LLB 1912, governor of Rhode Island
 Martha M. Coakley, JD 1979, Massachusetts attorney general (2007–2015), district attorney for Middlesex County, Massachusetts (1999-2007)
 William S. Cohen, LLB 1965, U.S. Secretary of Defense, U.S. senator from Maine
 Paul A. Dever, LLB 1926, governor of Massachusetts
 Joshua Eric Dodge, 1877, Wisconsin Supreme Court
 Samuel Felker, JD, governor of New Hampshire
 Michael F. Flaherty, JD 1994, president of the Boston City Council
 Michael D. Fricklas, JD 1984, executive vice president, general counsel and secretary of Viacom, Inc.
 Richard Graber, JD 1981, former United States ambassador to the Czech Republic
 Judd A. Gregg, JD 1972, LLM 1975, U.S. senator, Governor of New Hampshire
 Melanie B. Jacobs, JD 1994, dean of the University of Louisville School of Law
 Jeff Jacoby, JD 1983, Boston Globe opinion/editorial columnist
 Dr. Barbara C. Jordan, LLB 1959, first African-American woman elected to the U.S. Congress from a southern state, awarded the Presidential Medal of Freedom in 1994, first woman to deliver a keynote address at the Democratic National Convention in 1976
 David E. Kelley, JD 1983, Emmy winning television producer
 Robert Khuzami, JD 1983, director of Enforcement, U.S. Securities and Exchange Commission
 Gary F. Locke, JD 1975, US ambassador to China, United States Secretary of Commerce, governor of Washington, and the first Asian-American governor in the mainland U.S.
 Maria Lopez, JD 1978, first Hispanic appointed a judge in the Massachusetts, current television jurist on the U.S. syndicated television show Judge Maria Lopez
 Sandra Lynch, JD 1971, chief judge, U.S. Court of Appeals for the First Circuit
Frederick William Mansfield, LLB 1902, 46th mayor of Boston, Massachusetts, and 38th treasurer and receiver-general of Massachusetts
 Elizabeth (Sadie) Holloway Marston, LLB 1918 - co-creator of the comic book character Wonder Woman
 J. Howard McGrath, LLB 1929, sixtieth attorney general, 1949-52; U.S. senator, 1940–45 Governor of Rhode Island
 Thomas McIntyre, LLB 1940, U.S. senator (NH)
 F. Bradford Morse, LLB 1949, director of the United Nations Development Program
 Markos Moulitsas, JD 1999, founder of the popular blog, Daily Kos
 Shannon O'Brien, JD 1985, first woman to hold the office of treasurer and receiver general of the Commonwealth of Massachusetts
 Irving H. Picard, JD 1966, trustee in the liquidation of Bernard L. Madoff Investment Securities LLC
 Shari Redstone, JD 1979, LLM 1981, president of National Amusements and vice-chair of CBS Corporation and Viacom
 Chase T. Rogers, JD 1983, chief justice, Connecticut Supreme Court
 Greg Griffin, LLM 1984, Judge, Alabama 15th Judicial Circuit Court, First African American General Counsel of an Alabama State Agency
 William Russell, LLB 1879, governor of Massachusetts
 Sabita Singh, JD 1990, associate justice of the Appeals Court in the Commonwealth of Massachusetts
 Robert T. Stafford, LLB 1938; HON 1959, U.S. senator, father of the Robert T. Stafford Student Loan (Stafford Loan) program, the Robert T. Stafford Disaster Relief and Emergency Assistance Act (Stafford Act) and co-sponsor of the Wilderness Protection Act
 Niki Tsongas, JD 1988, congresswoman for Massachusetts's 5th congressional district
 Robert Upton, LLB 1907, U.S. senator (NH)
 David I. Walsh, LLB 1897, U.S. senator, governor of Massachusetts
 Myrth York, JD 1972, Rhode Island state senator, first female chair of the Senate Health, Education and Welfare Committee
 Owen D. Young, LLB 1896, founder of RCA, 1929 Time magazine's Man of the Year, chairman and CEO of General Electric
 David Zaslav, JD 1985, president and CEO, Discovery Communications, Inc.
 Howard Moore Jr, LLB 1960, general counsel Student Nonviolent Coordinating Committee (SNCC) and Federation of Southern Cooperatives

Faculty
 George Annas
 James Bessen
 James E. Fleming
 Tamar Frankel
 Wendy Gordon
 Keith Hylton
 Gary Lawson
 David Lyons
 Wendy Mariner
 Linda McClain
 Kevin Outterson
 Christopher T. Robertson
 Jay Wexler
 David H. Webber
 William G. Young

Former faculty
 Randy Barnett
 Janis M. Berry
 Danielle Citron
 Archibald Cox
 Edwin W. Hadley
 George Stillman Hillard
 Boyd B. Jones
 Rikki Klieman
 David A. Lowy
 Frank Parsons
 Arthur Holbrook Wellman
 Henry A. Wyman

References

External links

Boston University School of Law

 
Law schools in Massachusetts
Buildings at Boston University
Universities and colleges in Boston
Educational institutions established in 1872
1872 establishments in Massachusetts